The Air Warfare Centre (AWC) is a Force Element Group of the Royal Australian Air Force (RAAF) based at RAAF Base Edinburgh. It was formerly titled the Aerospace Operational Support Group (AOSG) and was reformed into the AWC in 2016.

The role of the AWC is similar to the AOSG and whilst it still conducts research and development on defence systems such as aircraft and weapons at the Woomera Test Range (WTR), it has expanded its role to address opportunities to improve Air Force's ability to maximise the operational effectiveness of fifth-generation, networked capabilities through improved integration across Defence and increased knowledge sharing with allied AWCs.

Units
As of February 2021, the Air Warfare Centre comprised:
Test and Evaluation Directorate
Aircraft Research and Development Unit
Air Warfare Engineering Squadron
Institute of Aviation Medicine
Aeronautical Information Service – Air Force 
Cyber and Electronic Warfare Directorate
Joint Electronic Warfare Operational Support Unit 
Joint Survivability and Tactics Validation Unit
No. 80 Squadron
No. 462 Squadron
Information Warfare Directorate
 Air Intelligence Training Unit
 No. 83 Squadron
 No. 87 Squadron
 No. 460 Squadron
 No. 464 Squadron
Tactics and Training Directorate
Air Warfare School
No. 88 Squadron

References

External links
Air Warfare Center (AWC) home page

RAAF groups
Military units and formations established in 2016
2016 establishments in Australia